Hoodlum Empire is a 1952 American film noir crime film directed by Joseph Kane starring Brian Donlevy, Claire Trevor, Forrest Tucker, Vera Ralston, Luther Adler and John Russell. It was inspired by the Kefauver Committee hearings dealing with organized crime.

Plot
Former gangster Joe Gray (Russell) joined the army during World War II and became a hero is now leading a respectable life. When he is called before a grand jury to testify against organized crime activities, his former mobster colleagues prepare to take measures to ensure that he doesn't.

Cast
 Brian Donlevy as Senator Bill Stephens 
 Claire Trevor as Connie Williams 
 Forrest Tucker as Charley Pignatalli 
 Vera Ralston as Marte Dufour 
 Luther Adler as Nick Mancani 
 John Russell as Joe Gray 
 Gene Lockhart as Senator Tower 
 Grant Withers as Rev. Simon Andrews 	 
 Taylor Holmes as Benjamin Lawton 	 
 Roy Barcroft as Louis Draper 
 William Murphy as Pete Dailey 
 Richard Jaeckel as Ted Dawson 
 Don Beddoe as Senator Blake 
 Roy Roberts as Chief Thales 
 Richard Benedict as Tanner 
 Phillip Pine as Louis "Louie" Barretti 
 Damian O'Flynn as Ralph Foster 
 Pat Flaherty as Mikkelson

References

External links
 
 
 
 

1952 films
1952 crime films
American crime films
American black-and-white films
Film noir
Films about organized crime in the United States
Films directed by Joseph Kane
Films scored by Nathan Scott
Republic Pictures films
1950s English-language films
1950s American films